William Douglas Albury (born 9 February 1947) is a former Australian first-class cricketer who played for Queensland in 28 first-class matches from 1970 to 1974.

An accurate opening or first-change bowler, Bill Albury's best first-class figures were 5 for 90 (followed by 3 for 34 in the second innings) when Queensland beat Western Australia in the Sheffield Shield in 1972–73. 

Albury played 42 seasons with the Brisbane club Wynnum Manly. The Wynnum Manly club home ground is named the Bill Albury Oval after him.

See also  
 List of Queensland first-class cricketers

References

External links 
 

1947 births
Living people
Australian cricketers
Queensland cricketers
Cricketers from Brisbane